Bodo Heinrich Justus Ebhardt (5 January 1865, Bremen – 13 February 1945 at Marksburg near Braubach) was a German architect, architectural historian, castle explorer, and founder and longtime president of the German Castles Association (Deutsche Burgenvereinigung).

Life
Ebhardt was the son of Bremen furniture manufacturer and businessman Carl Ebhardt and his wife Agnes (Krollmann) Ebhardt. He attended school in Sankt Goarshausen, where he became fascinated by castles. After graduation he was a commercial apprentice in Magdeburg and Bremen from 1880, but soon gave up this job against the wishes of his parents to self-educate and attended lectures in Berlin. In 1890 he opened his own architectural studio in Berlin. As a castle researcher and restorer, he won the friendship of Kaiser Wilhelm II. He became noted for the reconstruction of numerous castles.

In 1899 he founded the German Castles Association and from 1909 he lived on the Marksburg in Braubach. Ebhardt was a professor and court architect, in 1909 honorary citizen of Braubach, and in 1928 was a founding member of the Association of Friends of Plassenburg. He was also a member of the Berlin Masonic lodge Zum Pegasus.

Buildings and designs
1892–1893: Villa Seibt in Berlin-Grunewald
1893–1894: Landhaus Ebhardt in Berlin-Grunewald
1894: Residential and business complex "Wilhelmshof" in Groß-Lichterfelde near Berlin
1894: Log house "Fürstenhof" in Karlshorst near Berlin
1894–1895: Stable building of the Villa Färber in Aachen- Burtscheid
1895–1896: Schröder-Poggelow House in Berlin-Tiergarten
1896: Villa Scheche in Berlin Grunewald
1896: Ebhardt residence in Berlin-Tiergarten , Rauchstraße 13
1898: Sports memorial in Berlin, demolished 1973
1899–1901: Villa Langenscheidt in the "Alsen Colony" , Berlin-Wannsee , Colomierstraße 1 (stable building added 1902–1903)
1899–1900: Villa Passow/Fulvius/Voss (today Dressler-Verlag) in Heidelberg, Gaisbergstraße 55
1900–1934: Restoration of the Marksburg above Braubach am Rhein
1901–1908: Restoration of the Hohkönigsburg (French Haut-Kœnigsbourg) in Alsace
1901–1902: Villa Cornelius Meyer in Berlin-Grunewald
1901–1902: Reconstruction of the Castle Hohenhaus (Herleshausen)
1903: War memorial 1870/71 in Braubach
before 1904: Farm building for Villa Martin in Neubabelsberg
1904: Villa Remmer in Berlin Grunewald
1904–1906: Expansion of the Castle Landonvillers in Lorraine
1905–1906: Restoration of the church hall of Altenburg Castle after a fire
1906–1908: New construction of the Hakeburg in Kleinmachnow
1906–1908: Restoration and supplementary buildings at Grodziec Castle
1906–1925: Restoration and extension of Neuenstein Palace (Hohenlohe)
1908–1909: Villa Ribbeck in Berlin-Grunewald
1909–1925: Restoration and construction of several new buildings at Veste Coburg
before 1910: Haus Lucke in Schlettstadt
1910: Competition design for a Bismarck National Monument on the Elisenhöhe near Bingerbrück (not awarded). The monument was never constructed.
1911–1912: Restoration of Sallgast Palace
1911–1913: Expansion of Castle Wommen
1912: Restoration of Castle Langenau
1912–1913: von der Heydt bank headquarters (so-called "Kleisthaus") in Berlin, Mauerstraße 53
1912–1914: New construction of the Wartburg-Gasthof in Eisenach
1912–1914: Restoration of Tzschocha Castle
1913–1914: Restoration and extension of Schloss Groß Leuthen
1913–1916: Princely Court Theater in Detmold
1914–1915: Expansion of Allianz Versicherungs-AG in Berlin
1914–1925: Free reconstruction of the Kipfenberg Castle
1916: Development plan and drafts for the reconstruction of Neidenburg's town hall
1920: Attempt to restore Neuhausen Palace
1920–1921: Restoration of Kaulsdorf Castle
1920–1923: Restoration of Castle Eichicht
1921–1923: Restoration of Scharfenstein Castle after a fire
1921–1923: Restoration of Creuzburg Castle
1922–1927: New construction of the Hornburg on existing foundation walls
1922–1928: Expansion of Heimhof Castle
1922–1935: Restoration of Gröditz Castle near Weißenberg
1926–1927: Petschull House in Diez on the Lahn
1929–1930: Restoration of the Gollwitz Mansion
1931–1932: Reconstruction of the Arienfels Palace (Schloss Arenfels) near Hönningen on the Rhine
1933–1935: New construction of the castle-like Villa Mühlberg in Ohrdruf

Publications

An extensive list of the writings critically annotated by Ludger Fischer can be found in the publication Burgenromantik und Burgenrestaurierung um 1900.

Further reading

F. Canali, L'architetto Bodo Aebhardt nel Salento, in F. Canali e V. C. Galati, Paesaggi, Città e Monumenti di Salento e Terra d'Otranto tra Otto e Novecento, Firenze, 2018.
 
 
 Ludger Fischer: Das Herrenhaus von der Marwitz in Friedersdorf/Brandenburg. Bodo Ebhardts nicht ausgeführte Planungen zur Umgestaltung und Erweiterung des zuvor von Schinkel umgebauten Herrenhauses. In: Burgen und Schlösser. 2000/II, S. 83–87.
 Ludger Fischer: Die Toranlage von Schloß Kranichfeld. Ein Bodo Ebhardt-Bau am falschen Platz. In: Burgen und Schlösser. 1996/III, S. 126–129.
 Ludger Fischer: Burg Heimhof in der Oberpfalz. Bodo Ebhardts gescheiterte Wohnidee. In: Burgen und Schlösser. 1996/II, S. 80–85.

Gallery

References

1865 births
1945 deaths
19th-century German architects
20th-century German architects
German architectural historians